Klose is a surname of German, Silesian, and West Slavic origins, and may refer to

 Adolf Klose (1844–1923), German railroad engineer and inventor
 Alfred Klose (1895–1953),(de) German mathematician
 Anastasia Klose (born 1978), Australian artist
 Annika Klose (born 1992), German politician
 Bob Klose (born 1945), British musician and photographer
 Friedrich Klose (1862–1942), German composer
 Hans-Ulrich Klose (born 1937), German politician (SPD)
 Hyacinthe Klosé (1808–1880), French composer and inventor of the Böhm clarinet system
 Josef Klose (born 1947), Polish football player
 Kevin Klose (born 1940), American public radio CEO
 Kirsten Klose (born 1977), German hammer thrower
 Margarete Klose (1899–1968), German opera singer (contralto)
 Miroslav Klose (born 1978), German footballer
 Samuel Gottlieb Klose, German Lutheran missionary - see German Australians#German missionaries
 Timm Klose (born 1988), Swiss footballer

See also
 Kut Klose, R&B group 
 Close (disambiguation)

References

German-language surnames
Surnames of Silesian origin
Surnames from given names